Kahul may refer to:
 Cahul, Moldova
 Kahul, Iran
 Kahul-e Bala, Iran
 Kahul-e Pain, Iran